Saavedra is a commune of Chile in Cautín Province, Araucanía Region. The principal community and administrative centre of the commune is the town of Puerto Saavedra. The commune is named after the Chilean soldier General Cornelio Saavedra Rodríguez who was placed in charge of the occupation of the Araucanía in 1860. It has the highest percentage—though not the largest number—of Mapuche people in the region (64%, 2002 census). Location for the 1991 movie "La frontera".

Demographics
Of these, 2,679 (19.1%) lived in urban areas and 11,355 (80.9%) in rural areas. The population fell by 2.8% (398 persons) between the 1992 and 2002 censuses.

Administration
As a commune, Saavedra is a third-level administrative division of Chile administered by a municipal council, headed by an alcalde who is directly elected every four years. The 2008-2012 alcalde is Ricardo Tripainao Calfulaf (PPD).

Within the electoral divisions of Chile, Saavedra is represented in the Chamber of Deputies by José Manuel Edwards (RN) and Joaquín Tuma (PDC) as part of the 51st electoral district, together with Carahue, Nueva Imperial, Teodoro Schmidt, Freire, Pitrufquén and Cholchol. The commune is represented in the Senate by José Garcia Ruminot (RN) and Eugenio Tuma Zedan (PPD) as part of the 15th senatorial constituency (Araucanía-South).

References

Communes of Chile
Populated places in Cautín Province
1895 establishments in Chile
Coasts of Araucanía Region